The Turbio River (or Rio Turbio in Spanish) rises in a mountainous region of the Argentine Andes and discharges to the Última Esperanza Sound in Chile. Río Turbio headwaters are in a part of the Andes where there is no central valley, or gap between the eastern and western ridges.  Not far from its mouth to the northwest lies the Cueva del Milodón Natural Monument, where remains of the extinct giant sloth have been discovered, along with evidence of habitation by early man c. 10,000 BC.

See also
Eberhard Fjord
Hermann Eberhard
Lago Porteno

References

Rivers of Santa Cruz Province, Argentina
Rivers of Magallanes Region
Rivers of Chile
Rivers of Argentina